The Ministry of Digital Development, Communications and Mass Media of the Russian Federation, also known as MinTsifry Rossii ( lit. "Mindigit"), is a ministry of the Government of Russia responsible for telecommunications, media and the post. 

The Ministry of Digital Development, Communications and Mass Media was established in May 2008 from successor agencies of the Ministry of Communications of the USSR, and was known as the Ministry of Telecom and Mass Communications until it receiving its current name in 2018. The ministry is subdivided into functional departments including Roskomnadzor, Rospechat and Rossvyaz. It is headquartered at 7 Tverskaya Street in Tverskoy District, Moscow.

Maxut Shadayev has been the Minister of Telecom and Mass Communications since 21 January 2020.

In July 2021, the Ministry of Digital Development, Communications and Mass Media entered into an agreement with China's National Radio and Television Administration to cooperate on news coverage and media narratives.

Minister of Telecom and Mass Communications of the Russian Federation
Igor Shchyogolev (12 May 2008 — 20 May 2012)
Nikolay Nikiforov (21 May 2012 — 7 May 2018)
Konstantin Noskov (18 May 2018 — 21 January 2020)
Maxut Shadayev (21 January 2020 — present)

See also
E-Government in Russia
Freedom of the press in Russia
Internet in Russia
Media in Russia
Rostelecom
Russian Post
Svyazinvest
Telecommunications in Russia
Television in Russia
Special Communications Service of Russia
List of telecommunications regulatory bodies

References

Digital Development, Communications and Mass Media
Telecommunications in Russia
Postal system of Russia
Government agencies established in 2008
2008 establishments in Russia